Produced by Japanese animation studio Tokyo Movie Shinsha, Lupin the 3rd Part II is the second Lupin III television series. The series contains 155 episodes which aired between October 3, 1977, and October 6, 1980, on the Japanese television network NTV (Nippon Television). Episodes 145 and 155 were the first to appear in the United States on VHS, released by Streamline Pictures separately in 1994 as Tales of the Wolf and together in 1995 as Lupin III's Greatest Capers. Two feature films, The Mystery of Mamo and The Castle of Cagliostro, were released in theaters during the original broadcast run of the series. 26 episodes of Geneon Entertainment's English adaptation of the anime (the first 27 episodes, excluding the third) aired on Adult Swim starting on January 13, 2003. 15 Region 1 DVD volumes (a total of 79 episodes) have been released in the United States by Geneon Entertainment. Richard Epcar, the voice of Jigen, revealed via Twitter that Geneon lost the license to the series before they could dub the rest of the episodes in English. In December 2015, Discotek Media announced it had licensed the show and would be releasing the Second Series in four DVD sets, with the first one coming in 2016.

The series, based on the Lupin III manga written by Monkey Punch beginning in 1967, centers on the adventures of Arsène Lupin III, the grandson of Arsène Lupin, the gentleman thief of Maurice Leblanc's series of novels. He is joined by Daisuke Jigen, crack-shot and Lupin's closest ally; Fujiko Mine, the femme fatale and Lupin's love interest who works against Lupin more often than with him; and Goemon Ishikawa XIII, a master swordsman and the descendant of Ishikawa Goemon, the legendary Japanese bandit. Lupin is often chased by Inspector Koichi Zenigata, the rather cynical detective who has made it his life mission to catch Lupin.

Series overview

Episode list

Season 1 (1977–78)

Season 2 (1978)

Season 3 (1978–79)

Season 4 (1979–80)

See also

 Lupin III
 List of Lupin the Third Part I episodes
 List of Lupin III Part III episodes
 List of Lupin the Third: The Woman Called Fujiko Mine episodes
 List of Lupin the 3rd Part IV: The Italian Adventure episodes
 List of Lupin the 3rd Part V: Misadventures in France episodes
 List of Lupin the 3rd Part 6 episodes
 List of Lupin III television specials

Notes

References
Specific 
 Original Japanese titles were obtained from:  (Official Japanese website with episode listings)
 Original airdates were obtained from:  (Unofficial English website with episode listings translated into English)
 English translations and information about episodes broadcast in stereo and produced by Studio Telecom were obtained from: 
 American DVD release titles were obtained from the Region 1 DVDs released by Geneon

General

Lupin the Third Part II
Lupin the Third Part II

es:Anexo:Episodios de Lupin III#Serie 2 (1977)